Hotel Indigo Edinburgh is a hotel on Princes Street, Edinburgh. In 2016 it became part of the Hotel Indigo chain.

References

Hotels in Edinburgh
Category B listed buildings in Edinburgh
Listed hotels in Scotland
Hotel buildings completed in 1898
Hotels established in 1899
1899 establishments in Scotland
New Town, Edinburgh